The Swap is a 2016 American television teen film that premiered on Disney Channel as a part of the network's annual "Monstober" event on October 7, 2016. The film is based on the young adult novel of the same name written by Megan Shull and is written by Charlie Shahnaian and Shari Simpson and directed by Jay Karas. The movie stars Peyton List and Jacob Bertrand.

Plot 

High school sophomores Jack Malloy and Ellie O’Brien are going through hard times. Jack's mother has recently died, leaving him with his roughhousing older brothers and cold seemingly heartless dad, who puts pressure on his sons to be macho men, with all fighting and no crying. Ellie's own dad has walked out on her and her “helicopter” mom, and her best friend since kindergarten, Sassy, has started ignoring her in favor of the more feminine yet nastier new girl, Aspen. Jack and Ellie have big sports events coming up over the weekend. Jack is trying out for the varsity hockey team but has to deal with the bullying Porter, who has always lost the last spot on varsity to one of Jack's brothers.  Ellie's rhythmic gymnastics team has to win big at the upcoming tournament, or budgets cuts at school will have it demoted from “team” to “club”.

On Friday, they both end up in the nurse's office, after Jack is hurt in a scuffle with Porter, and Ellie starts crying after hearing Aspen say mean things about her to Sassy behind her back.  They start fighting, with Ellie saying boys have it better than girls by not having to deal with friend drama, but Jack says girls have it easier because they can be as emotional as they want. The tired nurse gets them to continue their fighting via text, and they text each other on how they wished they had each other's lives.  Suddenly, magic lightning strikes and knocks them out, and when they get up, they realize that they have swapped bodies. Ellie remembers something her mom said about how “investing too much emotional energy into an object gives it power over you.”  In this case, their respective cell phones, which they cherished because each had once belonged to their now absent parent, had the power to grant their texted wish.  After failing to swap back, they decide to look for a book belonging to Ellie's mom to reverse the spell. However, they find out their time is limited since Ellie's dad will be canceling their family phone plan, starting on Sunday.

Cast 
 Peyton List as Ellie O'Brien
 Jacob Bertrand as Jack Malloy
 Darrin Rose as Coach Malloy
 Claire Rankin as Summer
 Callan Potter as Gunner
 Jesse Bostick as Stryker
 Eliana Jones as Aspen Bishop
 Kiana Madeira as Sassy Gaines
 Kolton Stewart as Owen
 James Godfrey as Porter Gibbs
 Devyn Nekoda as Mackenzie Wick
 Naomi Snieckus as Coach Carol
 Linda Kash as Nurse Helen
 Naya Liviah as Claire
 Michael Fessaha as Ryan
 Marcia Johnson as Dr. Baker
 Valerie Descheneaux as Stylist
 Danny Smith as Clerk
 Mark Hickox as Badminton Coach

Ratings 
During its premiere in the 8:00 PM time slot, The Swap attracted a total of 2.64 million viewers with a 0.48 rating for people aged 18–49.

References

External links 

2016 television films
2016 films
2010s teen comedy films
American teen comedy films
Body swapping in films
Disney Channel Original Movie films
Films about wish fulfillment
Films based on American novels
Films based on young adult literature
Films shot in Toronto
American ice hockey films
Television shows based on American novels
Films directed by Jay Karas
2010s American films